The Frankfurt Major, also known as the Fall Major, was a Dota 2 tournament which took place from November 13–21, 2015. The tournament took place at the Festhalle Frankfurt in Frankfurt, Germany. It was the first of three Valve sponsored major Dota tournaments for the 2015–16 season, which were announced by the company on April 25, 2015. 16 teams competed in the tournament, which used the same format as The International 2015. The Electronic Sports League (ESL) hosted and organized the tournament.

Eight teams received direct invitations, which were announced on October 5. Regional Qualifiers took place on October 10–13, while the Open Qualifiers, open to any player, were run on October 6–9. Registration for the Open Qualifiers began on October 1. Although directly invited, China-based team Invictus Gaming encountered visa problems and on November 11 it was announced they would be replaced by another Chinese team, Newbee Young.

During the first stage, four groups of four teams played each other in a round-robin. Matches were a best-of-three double elimination. The main stage was double-elimination, with best-of-three matches save for the grand finals, which was a best-of-five. The tournament was won by European team OG.

Participating teams

Results 
(Note: Prizes are in USD)

References

External links
 Official website

Dota 2 Majors
2015 in esports
2015 in German sport
November 2015 sports events in Germany
ESL (company) competitions